The first World Grand Champions Cup women's volleyball was held in Japan from 16 to 21 November 1993.

Teams

Squads

Competition formula
The competition formula of the 1993 Women's World Grand Champions Cup is the single Round-Robin system. Each team plays once against each of the 5 remaining teams. Points are accumulated during the whole tournament, and the final standing is determined by the total points gained.

Venues
Yoyogi National Gymnasium (Tokyo)
Osaka-jō Hall (Osaka)

Results

|}

Tokyo round

|}

Osaka round

|}

Final standing

Individual awards
MVP:  Regla Bell
Best Scorer:  Yevgeniya Artamonova
Best Spiker:  Regla Bell
Best Blocker:  Asako Tajimi
Best Server:  Yevgeniya Artamonova
Best Setter:  Marlenis Costa
Best Receiver:  Regla Bell

External links
Results

FIVB Volleyball Women's World Grand Champions Cup
World Grand Champions Cup
FIVB Women's World Grand Champions cup
V